The Peter A. Beachy House is a home in the Chicago suburb of Oak Park, Illinois that was entirely remodeled by architect Frank Lloyd Wright in 1906. The house that stands today is almost entirely different from the site's original home, a Gothic cottage. The home is listed as a contributing property to the Frank Lloyd Wright-Prairie School of Architecture Historic District, which was listed on the U.S. National Register of Historic Places.

History
The original home, a Gothic cottage, was almost entirely replaced when banker Peter A. Beachy commissioned Frank Lloyd Wright to "remodel" the home. The house is set at right angles to the street to utilize part of the cottage's original foundation and take full advantage of a southern exposure. Wright built this house after returning from a trip to Japan, and the exterior has several Japan-inspired elements.

Architecture
Though the Beachy House incorporates an earlier structure, the original building is obliterated on the interior. The only points that the original house, known as the Fargo House, still exist are found in the basement of the Beachy House. The house has seven gables and sits on the largest residential lot in Oak Park. Much of the furniture in the house was also Wright designed but the windows contained only wooden muntins, no leaded or colored glass. However, Wright designed leaded-glass light fixtures which are used throughout the house.

Significance
The Peter A. Beachy House is an example of Wright's prairie design work. It is listed as a contributing property to the Frank Lloyd Wright-Prairie School of Architecture Historic District. The historic district joined the U.S. National Register of Historic Places in 1973. The Peter A. Beachy House is one of three homes in Oak Park that Wright was commissioned to "remodel." The other two are the 1906 Hills-DeCaro House, which was under renovation when the Hills House was built, and the William H. Copeland House, also on Forest Avenue.

Notes

References
 Storrer, William Allin. The Frank Lloyd Wright Companion. University Of Chicago Press, 2006,  (S.117)

Frank Lloyd Wright buildings
Frank Lloyd Wright Prairie School of Architecture Historic District
Houses completed in 1906
Houses on the National Register of Historic Places in Cook County, Illinois
Houses in Cook County, Illinois
Historic district contributing properties in Illinois
1906 establishments in Illinois